Gregory Haddad (born March 21, 1966) is an American politician who has served in the Connecticut House of Representatives from the 54th district since 2011. He is a Democrat who lives in and represents the town of Mansfield.

Education and career 
Haddad received his bachelor's degree in physics from the University of Connecticut in 1989. Prior to his election had worked as a legislative aide and assistant chief of staff for Democratic state senators for 14 years.

References

1966 births
Living people
Democratic Party members of the Connecticut House of Representatives
21st-century American politicians
University of Connecticut alumni
People from Mansfield, Connecticut